John Joseph McFall (February 20, 1918 – March 7, 2006) was a Democratic member of the United States House of Representatives, representing the state of California, rising to the position of House Majority Whip.

Early life and career
McFall was born in Buffalo, New York, and his family moved to Manteca, California, where he attended school. He attended Manteca High School and graduated from Modesto Junior College in 1936. He then graduated from the University of California, Berkeley in 1938, and obtained his law degree from the UC Berkeley School of Law in 1941. His career as an attorney was interrupted by service in the Army Security Intelligence Corps from 1942 to 1946, where he was stationed in the United States and became a sergeant.

Politics
In 1948, McFall became a Manteca councilman. He was elected to the state assembly in 1951 and served there until his election to the United States Congress in 1956. McFall served eleven terms in Congress, but lost his bid for re-election to a 12th term in 1978 and resigned on December 31, 1978.

Koreagate

Congressman McFall, along with other elected officials, was reprimanded for his role in the influence peddling scandal that came to be known as Koreagate.

Personal life and death

He married Evelyn A.M. Anklam McFall in 1950. The couple had four children.  In 1978 he retired to Alexandria, Virginia.  He died March 7, 2006, from complications of a broken hip and Parkinson's disease.

See also
List of federal political scandals in the United States
List of United States representatives expelled, censured, or reprimanded

References

External links

 John McFall Collection at the Carl Albert Center

|-

|-

|-

1918 births
2006 deaths
20th-century American politicians
California city council members
Censured or reprimanded members of the United States House of Representatives
Democratic Party members of the United States House of Representatives from California
Mayors of places in California
Democratic Party members of the California State Assembly
People from Manteca, California
Politicians from Buffalo, New York
United States Army non-commissioned officers
UC Berkeley School of Law alumni
University of California, Berkeley alumni